Tom Christie (born 4 March 1998 in New Zealand) is a New Zealand rugby union player who plays for the  in Super Rugby. His playing position is flanker. He has signed for the Crusaders squad in 2020.

Christie played for the New Zealand U20's rugby union team, winning the world cup in 2017 and captaining the side in 2018.

References

External links

1998 births
New Zealand rugby union players
Living people
Rugby union flankers
Canterbury rugby union players
Crusaders (rugby union) players
Rugby union players from Christchurch